J. Stinson Farm is a historic farm located near Newark, New Castle County, Delaware. The property includes three contributing buildings. They are a stone and frame bank barn (c. 1810), an early 19th-century stuccoed masonry house with an addition dated to about 1900, and a late-19th century, frame implement shed.  The house is a two-story, three bay, gable-roofed, stuccoed stone building.  It has a Georgian form and the addition has Queen Anne style detailing.

It was added to the National Register of Historic Places in 1986.

References

Farms on the National Register of Historic Places in Delaware
Georgian architecture in Delaware
Commercial buildings completed in 1810
Houses in New Castle County, Delaware
National Register of Historic Places in New Castle County, Delaware